Gary Eastwood (born 21 March 1983), nicknamed Clint, is an English professional darts player who competes in events of the Professional Darts Corporation (PDC).

Eastwood entered UK Q-School in 2018, winning a two-year Tour Card by finishing in the top 15 on the Order of Merit after the four days of Q-School were completed.

References

External links

1983 births
Living people
Professional Darts Corporation former tour card holders
People from Wokingham
English darts players